The 2007–08 Nicaraguan Professional Baseball League season finished with the Indios del Bóer winning the competition.

Standings

Final Series
Indios del Bóer - Fieras del San Fernando 4-2 wins

References
Standings from 2007-08 LNBP season

Nicaraguan Professional Baseball League
Nicaraguan Professional Baseball League
Nicaraguan Professional Baseball League
B
B